Kufa is a rural locality (a selo) in Rutulskoye Rural Settlement, Rutulsky District, Republic of Dagestan, Russia. The population was 312 as of 2010. There is 1 street.

Geography 
Kufa is located in the valley of the Samur river, 8 km northwest of Rutul (the district's administrative centre) by road. Kala and Amsar are the nearest rural localities.

Nationalities 
Rutuls live there.

References 

Rural localities in Rutulsky District